The Nevins Street station is an express station on the IRT Eastern Parkway Line of the New York City Subway. Located at the intersection of Nevins Street, Flatbush Avenue, and Fulton Street in Downtown Brooklyn, it is served by the 2 and 4 trains at all times, the 3 train all times except late nights, and the 5 train on weekdays only.



History 

The IRT Brooklyn/Eastern Parkway Line was contracted in 1904 as a two-track line under Fulton Street expanding to three tracks under Flatbush Avenue, to end at the Long Island Rail Road terminal under Atlantic Avenue. The Board of Rapid Transit Railroad Commissioners halted work in April 1905 for redesign. By that date, the tunnels had been dug out and steelwork had been installed. Work resumed in October 1905 with two additional tracks added, making four under Fulton Street and five under Flatbush Avenue. The additional trackways were added outside the trackways already set in place.

Under the 1905 redesign, numerous provisions were made for connections to future routes. In the area around the Nevins Street station, which was partially constructed as a local station on a three track subway, a new lower level was added underpinning the structure that had been built. The lower level had one trackway and platform in the station, with two connections on each side, all built at great cost under existing work, but none of it was ever used.

In the 1950s, a derailment occurred on the curve north of the station. This derailment prompted the installation of grade timer signals.

In 1981, the Metropolitan Transportation Authority listed the station among the 69 most deteriorated stations in the subway system.

Station layout 

The station has two island platforms, situated between the express and local tracks in each direction. A fifth track once existed between the two express tracks. The fifth track was removed in 1956. Original plans called for this to be a local station on a three-track line, but before it opened the two outer local tracks were added. Fare control is in an upper mezzanine, with a crossunder via part of an unused lower-level platform. Next to this platform is a single unused trackway under the southbound local track.

The underpass between the main platforms is the only portion of the lower level that has ever been used. Because the station was designed as a local station with side platforms, it is too close to street level for a mezzanine over the tracks. The stairs up lead to two separate fare control mezzanines located over the platforms only, with stairs up to the street. The only way between platforms inside the station is the underpass.

In the station is a "Nevins St." mosaic. The mezzanine walls feature a mosaic frieze by Anton von Dalen, installed in 1997 and entitled Work & Nature. The mosaic is 14 inches by 83 feet along both walls of the mezzanine. The work is in the tones of soft blue, green, and ochre, like the original platform mosaics. It features stenciled silhouettes in black of a woman operating a sewing machine, a mother taking care of a child, a man planting a tree, an architect reading a blueprint, a female executive addressing a meeting, and famous musician Furry Lewis. All of these characters symbolize, according to the artist, "pride, dignity, and beauty surrounding all work".

Exits
The station has two exits to each side of Flatbush Avenue east of Nevins Street. The northeastern side's entrances lead to the northbound platform while the southwestern side's entrances lead to the southbound platform.

Provisions for other lines
This unused trackway was part of several plans for connecting the line to other proposed lines. At its north end, this trackway splits from the southbound local track just south of Hoyt Street, and starts heading downgrade. The track was never laid. At the curve in the subway from Fulton Street to Flatbush Avenue, the trackway curves under the southbound local track, and is joined by another unused trackway heading north along Flatbush Avenue for a proposed Manhattan Bridge connection (which was later built for the BMT, though this connection may have still been planned when that line was built, as the DeKalb Avenue station was designed to allow for it). After the lower Nevins Street platform, a trackway splits to the east for a subway under Lafayette Avenue; this was later built as part of the IND Fulton Street and Crosstown Lines. Just beyond this split, at Lafayette Avenue, the trackway was cut by the IND when the IND was built from 1929 to 1937. On the other side, it rises again to merge with the southbound local track in the midst of the complicated switch layout just north of Atlantic Avenue – Barclays Center. Between this merge and Atlantic Avenue is another unused trackway, splitting from the local track towards a subway under Fourth Avenue (later built as the BMT Fourth Avenue Line). This trackway and another trackway (both built for the same proposed subway) end at the same level, under Fourth Avenue, just west of the Pacific Street station on the current BMT Fourth Avenue Line and a few feet higher.

On the northbound side, the connection provided by the lower level trackway would have been along the northbound local track (which was not in the original plans). The trackway on this side begins by curving from Fourth Avenue under the line. The place it used to rise is covered, as the trackway beyond that point is now used for the northbound local track. The ramp was covered in July 1963, and was made into a level trackway. This ramp was supposed to be northbound trackway of the proposed IRT Fourth Avenue Subway (before the BRT/BMT was built). The northbound local and express tracks were rearranged by November 1963.

Before Nevins Street, there is a bellmouth for the proposed Lafayette Avenue subway that merges into the northbound local track. After Nevins Street, at the curve, there is a short section of wall with no columns, that could be opened up. This was also a proposed connection to the Manhattan Bridge.

Just north of Atlantic Avenue – Barclays Center is another unused trackway, merging into the northbound local track from the LIRR's Atlantic Terminal. A trackway from the southbound tracks existed until 1911, when the platforms at Atlantic Avenue were lengthened.

For a time in the early 1960s, a false wall was installed to seal the ramp to the Nevins Street lower level. The false wall was taken down at a later date for unknown reasons. The Nevins Street lower-level platform had, over the years, become a storage area for various work projects, and until Nevins Street was renovated, the rest of the lower platform was visible from the crossunder. A permanent tile wall now blocks off the lower platform, access to which is via a cellar-type door at the north end of each platform, as well as doors from the crossunder.

Gallery

References

Further reading 
 Lee Stokey. Subway Ceramics: A History and Iconography. 1994. .

External links 

 nycsubway.org:
 Brooklyn IRT: Nevins Street
 Brooklyn IRT: Map 1, Brooklyn IRT Contract 2 (includes current and former track configurations, and provisions for future connections)
 Work & Nature Artwork by Anton van Dalen (1997)
 MTA's Arts For Transit—Nevins Street (IRT Eastern Parkway Line)

IRT Eastern Parkway Line stations
New York City Subway stations in Brooklyn
Railway stations in the United States opened in 1908
1908 establishments in New York City
Downtown Brooklyn